Agyneta larva is a species of sheet weaver found in Angola. It was described by Locket in 1968.

References

Endemic fauna of Angola
larva
Arthropods of Angola
Spiders of Africa
Spiders described in 1968